In Riemannian geometry, the cut locus of a point  in a manifold is roughly the set of all other points for which there are multiple minimizing geodesics connecting them from , but it may contain additional points where the minimizing geodesic is unique, under certain circumstances.  The distance function from p is a smooth function except at the point p itself and the cut locus.

Definition 
Fix a point  in a complete Riemannian manifold , and consider the tangent space .

The least distance from p to the cut locus is the injectivity radius at p.  On the open ball of this radius, the exponential map at p is a diffeomorphism from the tangent space to the manifold, and this is the largest such radius.  The global injectivity radius is defined to be the infimum of the injectivity radius at p, over all points of the manifold.

Characterization 
which joins them.  It is possible for both (1) and (2) to hold.

Examples 
On the standard round n-sphere, the cut locus of a point consists of the single point opposite of it (i.e., the antipodal point).  On
an infinitely long cylinder, the cut locus of a point consists of the line opposite the point.

Applications 
This idea is used in the local Laplacian comparison theorem and the local Hessian comparison theorem. These are used in the proof of the local version of the Toponogov theorem, and many other important theorems in Riemannian geometry.

Cut locus of a subset 
One can similarly define the cut locus of a submanifold of the Riemannian manifold, in terms of its normal exponential map.

See also 
 Caustic (mathematics)

References 

Riemannian geometry